Radosław Baran (born 5 November 1989 in Krotoszyn, Poland) is a Polish freestyle wrestler. He competed in the men's freestyle 97 kg event at the 2016 Summer Olympics, in which he was eliminated in the repechage by Reza Yazdani.

In March 2021, he competed at the European Qualification Tournament in Budapest, Hungary hoping to qualify for the 2020 Summer Olympics in Tokyo, Japan. He won his first match against Samuel Scherrer of Switzerland but he was then eliminated from the competition in his next match against Erik Thiele of Germany.

His brother Robert is also a freestyle wrestler.

References

External links
 

1989 births
Living people
Polish male sport wrestlers
Olympic wrestlers of Poland
Wrestlers at the 2016 Summer Olympics
People from Krotoszyn
Wrestlers at the 2015 European Games
Wrestlers at the 2019 European Games
European Games competitors for Poland
European Wrestling Championships medalists
21st-century Polish people